State Route 429 (SR 429) was a rural state highway located in southern Washoe County, Nevada. It followed Bowers Mansion Road, a former alignment of U.S. Route 395 (US 395). The SR 429 designation was retired in 2012, and the route has since become part of U.S. Route 395 Alternate.

Route description
SR 429 began at Hobart Road, near the Carson City – Washoe County line immediately adjacent to present-day Interstate 580 (I-580) and US 395. The highway continued northward past Bowers Mansion State Park before turning east to terminate at US 395 just south of Washoe City.

Occasionally, strong crosswinds are experienced on mainline US 395 through the Washoe Valley. When large-profile vehicles were prohibited on US 395 due to high wind, motorists were advised to detour onto SR 429. A slip ramp to US 395 at the highway's southern terminus facilitated this detour in the southbound direction.

History

SR 429 was the original US 395 highway alignment connecting Carson City to Reno. By 1970, a new divided highway alignment was opened to traffic between the Carson City limits and the northern terminus of present-day SR 429.  US 395 was switched to this new alignment, and present-day SR 429 remained in the state system with an unknown highway number.

With the completion of the I-580 freeway extension between the Washoe Valley and Reno in August 2012, the SR 429 designation was dropped and the majority of the highway became part of US 395 Alternate—the southernmost section between Hobart Road and Eastlake Boulevard is now classified as a frontage road.

Major intersections
This table lists major intersections as they existed prior to the elimination of SR 429 in 2012.

See also

References

429
Transportation in Washoe County, Nevada
U.S. Route 395